Karl Meixner (13 February 1903 – 29 December 1976) was an Austrian film actor.

Partial filmography

 Frederica (1932)
 The Testament of Dr. Mabuse (1933) - Hofmeister
 Hitlerjunge Quex (1933) - Wilde
 Refugees (1933) - Pappel
 The Young Baron Neuhaus (1934)
 Port Arthur (1936)
 Moscow-Shanghai (1936) - Pope
 White Slaves (1937) - Der Scharfrichter
 Men Without a Fatherland (1937) - Ein Aufwiegler
 Another World (1937) - Li, Carters Diener
 Starke Herzen (1937) - Ein aufständiger Kommunist vom Rollkommando
 Dance on the Volcano (1938) - Aufwiegler (uncredited)
 So You Don't Know Korff Yet? (1938) - Timor
 Pour le Mérite (1938) - Führer einer Kommunistenhorde
 The Governor (1939) - Diener bei Dr. Erko
 Bismarck (1940) - Loewe
  (1940) - Michel - Künstler
 Carl Peters (1941)
 Leichte Muse (1941)
 Wetterleuchten um Barbara (1941)
 Geheimakte W.B.1 (1942) - Senator
 The Thing About Styx (1942) - Kurier
 Rembrandt (1942)
 Titanic (1943) - Lord Astors 1. Sekretär Hopkins (uncredited)
 The Enchanted Day (1944) - Kriminalbeamter
 The Bridge (1949) - Hagerer
 Dark Eyes (1951) - von Pfandler
 Big City Secret (1952)
 The Land of Smiles (1952) - Exzellenz Tschang
 Cuba Cabana (1952) - Pandulkar
 The Major and the Bulls (1955) - Säusepp-Bauer
 Night of Decision (1956) - Francois
 Die fröhliche Wallfahrt (1956) - Brosel
 Night Nurse Ingeborg (1958) - Patient Krause
 Stalingrad: Dogs, Do You Want to Live Forever? (1959)
 Fabrik der Offiziere (1960)
 Flucht nach Berlin (1961)

Bibliography
 Kalat, David. The Strange Case of Dr. Mabuse: A Study of the Twelve Films and Five Novels. McFarland, 2005.
 Rentschler, Eric. The Ministry of Illusion: Nazi Cinema and Its Afterlife. Harvard University Press, 1996.

External links

1903 births
1976 deaths
Austrian male film actors
Male actors from Vienna
20th-century Austrian male actors